Robert Sellers (born 3rd February 1965 in Leeds) is an English writer and author, known for his show-business biographies and works on popular culture including Cult TV and The Battle for Bond, an analysis of the Fleming plagiarism trial and its aftermath.

Sellers graduated from drama school and initially pursued a career as a stand-up comedian. He then turned to film journalism, and has written for such publications as Daily Mail, Empire, Total Film, The Independent, SFX and Cinema Retro. Sellers has conducted interviews with such notable persons as Roger Moore, Christopher Lee, Michael Palin, Richard Dreyfuss and Ray Harryhausen.

Apart from biographies, Sellers had also written books on the entertainment industry. His book Very Naughty Boys: The Amazing True Story of HandMade Films, the inside story of the British film company HandMade Films, was described by Film Review magazine as "fascinating" and "impossible to put down".

Cult TV is the official history of ITC, Lew Grade's television company that made hit TV shows throughout the 1960s and 70s.

Sellers has contributed to a number of television documentaries including Channel 4's The 100 Best Family Films.

Published works
 Sting: A Biography (1989)
 The Films of Sean Connery (1990)
 Sigourney Weaver: A Biography (1992)
 Harrison Ford: A Biography (1993)
 Tom Cruise: A Biography (1997)
 Sean Connery: A Celebration (1999)
 The Radio Times Guide To Film (contributor) (2000)
The Radio Times Guide To Science Fiction (contributor) (2002)
 Very Naughty Boys: The Amazing True Story of HandMade Films (2003)
Cult TV: The Golden Age of ITC (2006)
The Battle for Bond (2006)
Hellraisers: The Life and Inebriated Times of Burton, Harris, O'Toole and Reed (2008)
James Robertson Justice – What's the Bleeding Time? (co-author) (2008)
 Hollywood Hellraisers: The Wild Life And Fast Times of Marlon Brando, Dennis Hopper, Warren Beatty and Jack Nicholson  (2009)
Vic Armstrong: Authorized Film Memoirs
What Fresh Lunacy Is This? – The Authorised Biography of Oliver Reed (2013)
Peter O'Toole: The Definitive Biography (2015)

References

External links

1965 births
Living people
English biographers